Voice Factory is a reality show by Citi FM and Citi TV in Ghana that initially started in 2009 on citi fm and in 2019 the fourth edition of the reality show was telecast live on the television. The reality show is a singing contest which bring together a number of contestant (singers, rappers and gospel acts) to compete for an ultimate price.

Winners

References 

Ghanaian television series
2009 Ghanaian television series debuts